"Bye, Bye, Baby (Baby, Goodbye)" is a popular song written by Bob Crewe and Bob Gaudio, a member of The Four Seasons, whose version of the song made it to No. 1 in Canada and No. 12 on the US Billboard Hot 100 in 1965. On the original issue of the single, the title was "Bye Bye Baby"; on the album The 4 Seasons Entertain You (and later issues of the song), the name was changed to the longer, more familiar name. The song is about saying goodbye, not because the person is unloved but rather because the relationship is adulterous ("there's a wedding ring on my finger").

After a winding seven-bar introduction in D major, featuring Frankie Valli's spoken recitation, the song settles into a triplet-swing beat and thereafter alternates between two keys, F-sharp major (in the chorus) and A major (in the verse and final chorus), bridging the gap with a five-step chromatic pivot-modulation (D-D-E-F-F over the line "She's got me and I'm not free").

Cash Box described it as "a heartfelt rhythmic stomp’er that again features the attention-getting falsetto sound of Frankie Valli and a top teen Calello arrangement."

Chart history

Other charting versions
A version by British group The Symbols reached No. 44 in the UK Singles Chart in 1967.

A Japanese version by Hiromi Go was released in December 1975 in Japan & Charted at No.9 in the Oricon charts, in the exact same backing sound style & step as the Rollers version, including an eight-bar guitar solo, distributed by CBS/Sony, which appears in his second compilation album Go Hiromi no Subete.

Bay City Rollers version

A cover of the song by the Bay City Rollers sold a million copies and hit No. 1 on the UK Singles Chart for six weeks from March 1975. It ended the year as the UK's top-selling single. The Four Seasons' version is quite sparse in instrumental backing, instead carried by the vocals, while the Bay City Rollers' is faster and has a fuller backing sound. Played a whole step lower, it includes an eight-bar guitar solo, supposedly by Eric Faulkner but probably a session musician, which is not present in the original.

Chart history

Weekly charts

Year-end charts

References

External links
 
 

1965 songs
1965 singles
1975 singles
The Four Seasons (band) songs
Bay City Rollers songs
Number-one singles in Australia
RPM Top Singles number-one singles
UK Singles Chart number-one singles
Irish Singles Chart number-one singles
Songs written by Bob Crewe
Songs written by Bob Gaudio
Song recordings produced by Bob Crewe
Song recordings produced by Phil Wainman
Philips Records singles
President Records singles